Beechnut may refer to:

 The nut of the Beech tree.
 Beech-Nut baby food
 Beech-Nut, a brand of chewing tobacco produced by the Lorillard Tobacco Company

See also
The Beach Nut

de:Buchecker